Pretty Prairie USD 311 is a public unified school district headquartered in Pretty Prairie, Kansas, United States.  The district includes the communities of Pretty Prairie, Castleton, and nearby rural areas.

Schools
The school district operates the following schools:
 Pretty Prairie High School
 Pretty Prairie Middle School
 Pretty Prairie Grade School

In 2016, Pretty Prairie USD311 made an "All School Video featuring all of their classes, and several High School level extra curricular teams.

See also
 List of high schools in Kansas
 List of unified school districts in Kansas

References

External links
 

School districts in Kansas